This is a list of council areas of Scotland ordered by the number of Scottish Gaelic speakers.

See also
Irish language in Northern Ireland
List of Welsh areas by percentage of Welsh-speakers

References
SCROL - Scotland's Census Results OnLine

Scottish Gaelic language
Scottish Gaelic speakers
Scottish Gaelic speakers
 Council areas by number of Scottish Gaelic speakers
Celtic language-related lists